Ashok Leyland is an Indian multinational automotive manufacturer, headquartered in Chennai. It is owned by the Hinduja Group. It was founded in 1948 as Ashok Motors which became Ashok Leyland in the year 1955. Ashok Leyland is the second-most successful manufacturer of commercial vehicles in India (with a market share of 32.1% in 2016), the third-most successful manufacturer of buses in the world, and the tenth-most successful manufacturer of trucks.

With the corporate office located in Chennai, its manufacturing facilities are in Ennore, Bhandara, two in Hosur, Alwar and Pantnagar. Ashok Leyland also has overseas manufacturing units with a bus manufacturing facility in Ras Al Khaimah (UAE), one at Leeds, United Kingdom and a joint venture with the Alteams Group for the manufacture of high-press die-casting extruded Aluminium components for the automotive and telecommunication sectors. Operating nine plants, Ashok Leyland also makes spare parts and engines for industrial and marine applications.

Ashok Leyland has a product range from 1T GVW (Overall Vehicle Weight) to 55T GTW (Overall Trailer Weight) in trucks, 9 to 80-seater buses, vehicles for defence and special applications, and diesel engines for industrial, genset and marine applications. In 2019, Ashok Leyland claimed to be in the top 10 global commercial vehicle makers. It sold approximately 140,000 vehicles (M&HCV and LCV) in 2016. The company has passenger transportation options ranging from 10 seaters to 74 seaters (M&HCV = LCV). In the trucks segment, Ashok Leyland primarily concentrates on the 16 to 25-ton range and has a presence in the 7.5 to 49 ton production range.

History

Ashok Motors
Ashok Motors was founded in 1948 by Raghunandan Saran, an Indian freedom fighter from Punjab. By the end of the Indian Independence Movement, he was persuaded by India's first Prime Minister Nehru to invest in a modern industrial venture. Ashok Motors was incorporated in 1948 as a company to assemble and manufacture Austin cars from England, and the company was named after the founder's only son, Ashok Saran. The company had its headquarters in Chennai, with the manufacturing plant in Chennai. The company was engaged in the assembly and distribution of Austin A40 passenger cars in India.

The collaboration ended sometime in 1975 but the holding of British Leyland, now a major British auto conglomerate as a result of several mergers, agreed to assist in technology, which continued until the 1980s. After 1975, changes in management structures saw the company launch various vehicles in the Indian market, with many of these models continuing to this day with numerous upgrades over the years.

Under Iveco and Hinduja partnership
In 1987, the overseas holding by Land Rover Leyland International Holdings Limited (LRLIH) was taken over by a joint venture between the Hinduja Group, the Non-Resident Indian transnational group and Iveco, part of the Fiat Group.

Hinduja Group
In 2007, the Hinduja Group bought out Iveco's indirect stake in Ashok Leyland. The promoter shareholding now stands at 51%. Today the company is the flagship of the Hinduja Group, a British-based and Indian originated trans-national conglomerate.

Ashok Leyland launched India's first electric bus and Euro 6 compliant truck in 2016.

In June 2020, Ashok Leyland launched its new range of modular trucks, AVTR.

In September 2020, Ashok Leyland launched the Bada Dost based on its indigenously developed LCV platform called Phoenix.

Partnerships

Hino Motors
During the early 1980s Ashok Leyland entered into a collaboration with Japanese company Hino Motors from whom technology for the H-series engines was sourced. Many indigenous versions of the H-series engine were developed with 4 and 6 cylinders, and also conforming to BS2, BS3 & BS4 emission standards in India. Most current models of Ashok Leyland come with H-series engines. Japan entered into a Mutual Cooperation Agreement (MCA) on 27 November 2017 renewing their cooperative agreement that had started in 1986. According to the agreement Ashok Leyland will use Hino's engine technology for its Euro 6 development and will support in the development of Hino's engine parts purchasing in India for global operation.

Rosoboronexport & ELCOM
Ashok Leyland Defence Systems (ALDS), Russia's Rosoboronexport and ELCOM Group have signed a cooperation agreement in defence business to provide tracked vehicles to Indian Armed Forces. The agreement was signed on the side lines of the International Military Technical Forum Army – 2017 held at Kubinka, near Moscow, on 25 August 2017.

IIT Madras
Ashok Leyland and Indian Institute of Technology Madras (IIT Madras) signed a memorandum of understanding, on 19 August 2017, for Ashok Leyland to sponsor the Centre of Battery Engineering (CoBE) at IIT Madras. As part of the agreement Ashok Leyland partnered with IIT Madras to carry out research and development (R&D) activities for strengthening battery engineering and related sub-parts, especially for electric vehicles.

Sun Mobility
On 18 July 2017 Ashok Leyland announced the formation of an alliance with SUN Mobility, The global partnership aims to develop electric vehicles.

Iveco partnership
In the late 1980s Iveco investment and partnership resulted in Ashok Leyland launching the 'Cargo' range of trucks based on European Ford Cargo trucks. The Cargo entered production in 1994, at Ashok Leyland's new plant in Hosur. These vehicles used Iveco engines and for the first time had factory-fitted cabs. Though the Cargo trucks are no longer in production and the use of Iveco engine was discontinued, the cab continues to be used on the Ecomet range of trucks as well as for several of Ashok Leyland's military vehicles.

ETG Group
On 26 May 2022, Ashok Leyland has announced partnership with ETG Group to strengthen its partnership in Africa. As part of the tie-up, ETG Logistics (ETGL) will operate dealerships for Ashok Leyland in six key southern African countries.

Products

Buses
Current range
MTC
12M: all applications (chassis only)
 12M FESLF: City bus (integral)
Viking:   All applications (integral and chassis only)
 Cheetah: all applications (integral and chassis only)
 Eagle: All applications (integral and chassis only)
 Electric Bus: All applications (integral)
 Freedom: intercity bus (integral and chassis only)
 Hawk: All applications (integral and chassis only)
 Falcon: All applications (integral and chassis only)
 Hybus low floor: City and tarmac bus (integral)
 JanBus: City and tarmac bus (integral)

JanBus is the world's first single step front engine bus introduced by Ashok Leyland .

 Lynx: All applications 
Mitr: metro feeder, school, staff (integral)

Ashok Leyland MiTR (or MiTR) is a Minibus manufactured by Ashok Leyland in Joint venture with Nissan. The vehicle was unveiled in January 2014 during the 12th Auto Expo 2014 and was launched in July 2014.

 Oyster: All applications (integral and chassis only)
 12M RE: City bus (integral)
 RESLF: City and tarmac bus (integral)
 REULE: City and tarmac bus (integral)
Sunshine: School bus (integral)
Titan: City bus (chassis only)

In 1968, production of the Leyland Titan ceased in Britain, but was restarted by Ashok Leyland in India. The Titan PD3 chassis was modified, and a five-speed heavy duty constant-mesh gearbox was used together with the Ashok Leyland version of the O.680 engine. The Ashok Leyland Titan continued in production for many years.

Former range

 Comet

Early products included the Leyland Comet bus which was a passenger body built on a truck chassis sold in large numbers to many operators in India. By 1963, the Comet was operated by every state transport undertaking in India, and over 8,000 were in service. It was soon joined in production by a version of the Leyland Tiger.

 Panther
 Falcon

Trucks 
Current range

General
 1916 4x2
 1920 4x2
Boss
Boss is an intermediate commercial vehicle launched by Ashok Leyland. It is available in the range of 11T to 18.5T. The presently available models are:
 1115
 1215
 1315
 1415
 1920
Ecomet
 1015
 1115
 1215
 1415
 1615
AVTR Modular Platform
 1920
 2620 (Life Axle Technology)
 2620 6x2 (Single-Tire Lift Axle)
 2820 6x2
 2820 6x4
 2825
 3120 6x2 (Double-Tire Lift Axle)
 3520 8x2 (Single-Tire Lift Axle/Twin Steer)
 3525 8x4
 4020
 4120 8x2 (Double-Tire Lift Axle)
 4125 8x2 (Double-Tire Lift Axle)
 4220 10x2
 4225 10x2
 4620
 4825 10x2 (Double-Tire Lift Axle)
 4825 10x4 (Double-Tire Lift Axle)
 5225
 5425
 5525 4x2
 5525 6x4

Former range
 Beaver
 Rhino
 U-Truck
 Captain

Light Vehicles
Current range

 Dost
 Bada Dost

The Dost is a 1.25 ton light commercial vehicle (LCV) that is the first product to be launched by the Indian-Japanese commercial vehicle joint venture Ashok Leyland Nissan Vehicles. Dost is powered by a 58 hp high-torque, 3-cylinder, turbo-charged common rail diesel engine and has a payload capacity of 1.25 tonnes. It is available in both BS3 and BS4 versions. The bodywork and some of the underpinnings relate to Nissan's C22 Vanette of the 1980s; this is most visible in the door design. The LCV is produced in Ashok Leyland's Hosur plant in Tamil Nadu. The LCV is available in three versions. With the launch of Dost Ashok Leyland has now entered the Light Commercial Vehicle segment in India

Guru
Partner

Former range

Stile

STiLE is a multi-purpose vehicle which was manufactured by Ashok Leyland. The vehicle was unveiled during the 2012 Auto Expo and was launched in July 2013. STiLE was marketed as a "multi-purpose vehicle" for use as a hotel shuttle, taxi, ambulance, and panel van, and in courier service. In May 2015, Ashok Leyland stopped production due to low demand.

Diesel Generators

Ashok Leyland offers Diesel Generators manufactured with Ashok Leyland engines and Leypower alternators. Currently they manufacture 5 to 2250 kVA Silent DG Sets.

Subsidiary ventures

Construction equipment
In June 2009 the company expanded into construction equipment segment, with a 50:50 joint venture with John Deere. It was floated as a separate entity under the name of Leyland – Deere Limited.

Ashok Leyland Defence Systems

Ashok Leyland Defence Systems (ALDS) is a newly floated company by the Hinduja Group. Ashok Leyland holds 26 percent in Ashok Leyland Defence Systems (ALDS). The company designs and develops defence logistics and tactical vehicles, defence communication and other systems. Ashok Leyland is the largest supplier of logistics vehicles to the Indian Army. It has supplied over 60,000 of its Stallion vehicles, all manufactured at the Vehicle Factory Jabalpur (VFJ).

International operations and exports

Exports of commercial vehicles contribute to a seven percent share of Ashok Leyland's total revenues.

The company has a presence in SAARC countries like Bangladesh, Sri Lanka and Nepal, and in the Middle East countries where it exports 3600–4000 units a year. The company has an assembly unit, mainly for buses, in Ras Al Khaimah in UAE to cater to the Gulf Cooperation Council (GCC) member states. This unit currently assembles 4000 units, which the company plans to increase to 6000 units.

Ashok Leyland exports medium and heavy commercial vehicles to the Gulf Cooperation Council (GCC) Member States like Bahrain, Kuwait, Oman, Qatar, Saudi Arabia, and UAE, Commonwealth of Independent States (CIS) countries like Azerbaijan, Armenia, Belarus, Georgia, Kazakhstan, Kyrgyzstan, Moldova, Russia, Tajikistan, Turkmenistan, Uzbekistan and Ukraine, East And West Africa, Sri Lanka, Bangladesh, Nepal, Indonesia and Malaysia. Every year Ashok Leyland exports about 12000 trucks to Bangladesh and Sri Lanka.

On 11 June 2012, Ashok Leyland supplied 100 Falcon buses to Ghana for $7.6 million (about 420 million). Ashok Leyland was awarded the first overseas order worth $6 million for its vestibule buses from Bangladesh Road Transport Corporation (BRTC).

Lanka Ashok Leyland

Lanka Ashok Leyland (LAL) in Sri Lanka was formed in 1982 and started its operations in 1983 as a joint venture between Lanka Leyland Ltd (a wholly owned company of the Government of Sri Lanka) and Ashok Leyland Ltd India. LAL imports commercial vehicles in both knock down kits and fully built, and carries out assembly operations, repair and service, and body building on chassis.

Avia
In October 2006, Ashok Leyland bought a large stake in the Czech-based Avia, later renaming as Avia Ashok Leyland Motors s.r.o., to gain entry into the European market. However, the prolonged recession in Europe forced them to shut down the Czech operations in 2013.

Optare

In 2010 Ashok Leyland acquired a 26% stake in the British bus manufacturer Optare, a company that was originally based on the premises of a former British Leyland subsidiary Charles H Roe before moving to the new purpose-built factory in 2011 in Sherburn-in-Elmet. In 2017, Ashok Leyland acquired a further 72.31% stake in Optare increasing its overall stake to 98.31%.

Technology

It was the first in India to introduce multi-axled trucks, full air brakes and innovations like the rear engine and articulated buses. In 1997, the company launched the country's first CNG bus, and in 2002 developed the first hybrid electric vehicle.

In the 1980s and 1990s, Ashok Leyland with various Tamil Nadu Transport Corporation, notably Cholan Roadways Corporation based in Trichripally, experimented with low pollutant emission based on the CNG technology. In 2002 it developed the first hybrid electric vehicle. Ashok Leyland has also launched a mobile emission clinic that operates on highways and at entry points to New Delhi. The clinic checks vehicles for emission levels, recommends remedies and offers tips on maintenance and care.

Hythane engines
Ashok Leyland has also developed hythane engines in association with the Australian company Eden Energy. Ashok Leyland developed a 6-cylinder,   BS-4 engine which uses hythane (H-CNG,) which is a blend of natural gas and around 20% of hydrogen. A 4-cylinder   engine is also being developed for H-CNG blend in a joint R&D program with MNRE (Ministry of New and Renewable Energy) and Indian Oil Corporation.

CNG engines
The CNG concept is operational, with more than 5,500 of the technology's vehicles running around Delhi. The company is also already discussing the wide-scale use of hythane engines with the Indian government.

Hybrid technology

Plugin Hybrid Bus
In the Auto Expo 2010 at Delhi, Ashok Leyland launched India's first plug-in CNG hybrid bus, HYBUS. The hybrid bus offered 20–30% fuel saving over conventional buses powered by internal combustion engine, and were more eco-friendly than regular CNG buses, as a result of its hybrid technology that combined conventional CNG engine with electric propulsion system. The propulsion system was powered by lithium-ion battery.

The other useful features of the bus included ultra-low entry at 390mm with kneeling option, noise-free rear engine, front and rear air suspensions and retractable ramp for wheel-chair entry. Some innovative pedestrian safety concepts were also introduced in the bus, like the sound and light alerts while the bus moves, a camera-assisted reversing aid for the driver and night time highlighters near the tail lights.

Non-plugin Hybrid Bus
At the Delhi Auto Expo 2016, Ashok Leyland introduced an advanced non-plugin version of HYBUS. It is claimed to be India's first non-plugin series hybrid bus. The bus uses ultra-capacitors to store energy, a feature that improves power density and fuel efficiency, because energy is stored electrostatically and does not involve chemical reactions. The ultra-capacitors are claimed to be 4–5 times more durable than conventional lithium-ion batteries.

HYBUS is powered by an H-Series 6-cylinder diesel (BS IV compliant) engine that is not used to drive the vehicle ahead, but to charge the ultra-capacitors that powers the 150 kW electric motor. Automatic start-stop is used to decrease the overall engine idling time. The bus can restart using the stored energy when the engine is off. The fuel-efficiency of the engine thus increases and NVH (Noise-vibration-harshness) levels decrease.

The buses and trucks are set to feature a new electronic shift-by-wire transmission technology as well as electronic-controlled engine management for greater fuel efficiency. Ashok Leyland focuses on improving fuel efficiency without affecting automotive power, and the vehicles will have a 5% improvement on fuel efficiency. Ashok Leyland is also developing electric batteries and bio-fuel modes.

Electric Technology
In 2016 the company launched the country's first indigenously produced fully electric bus, called Circuit. The bus is a zero-emission vehicle that can run 120 km on a single charge, and has an alert system that can signal if the bus is low on power. The bus will be introduced under the National Electric Mobility Plan with an aim of 20% penetration of electric or hybrid vehicles by 2020.

Euro VI Truck
AT the Delhi Auto Expo 2016, the company showcased its first indigenously produced Euro VI truck 4940. The truck is powered by the company's flagship range of engine, Neptune, which is an 8l engine that produces 400 hp and 1600Nm of torque. The truck is designed to meet Euro VI norms.

iEGR
In 2017, the company showcased iEGR (intelligent exhaust gas recirculation) technology for its trucks and buses to meet BS-IV emission standards. The technology also promises other advantages like better fuel efficiency than BS-III trucks, and power transmission up to 400 HP.

iBUS
Ashok Leyland announced iBUS in the beginning of 2008, as part of the future for the country's increasingly traffic-clogged major cities. Its Rs 60-lakh iBus is a feature-filled, low-floor concept bus for the metros revealed during the Auto Expo 2008 in India. This low-floored iBus will have the first of its kind features, including anti-lock braking system, electronic engine management and passenger infotainment. The executive class has an airline like ambiance with wide LCD screens, reading lights, audio speakers and, for the first time, Internet on the move. A GPS system enables vehicle tracking and display of dynamic route information on LCD screens, which can also support infotainment packages including live data and news. The bus will probably be equipped with an engine from the new Neptune family, which Ashok Leyland also introduced at this exhibition, which is ready for the BS4/Euro 4 emission regulations and can be upgraded to Euro 5. The ibus of Ashok leyland have hybrid technology

Financials

The company has maintained its profitable track record for 60 years. The annual revenue of the company was US$3.2 billion in 2016–17. Selling 140,457 light, medium, heavy vehicles in 2016–17, Ashok Leyland was one of India's largest exporters of medium and heavy duty trucks. It is also one of the largest private sector employers in India, with about 12,000 employees working in 9 factories and offices spread across the globe.

The company did not declare any dividends for the financial year 2013–14, which is also a first in its 60-year history.

Facilities

Manufacturing units

India

 Ennore, Tamil Nadu in North Chennai (established 1948) – trucks, buses, engines, axles etc.
 Hosur, Tamil Nadu in Krishnagiri District (established 1980) – three adjacent plants (Hosur-1, Hosur-2, CPPS) for trucks, special vehicles and power units
 Alwar, Rajasthan (established 1982) – bus manufacturing unit
 Bhandara, Maharashtra (established 1982) – gearbox unit
 Pantnagar, Uttarakhand (etsb. 2010) – 75,000 annual capacity greenfield unit for new generation platforms and cabs
 Sengadu Village, Kanchipuram District in Tamil Nadu (etsb. 2008) – technical and production facility for Ashok Leyland Defence Systems; another separate technical center for Nissan Ashok Leyland vehicles
 Mallavalli Village, Vijayawada, Andhra Pradesh (Estd 2021) – Bus manufacturing Unit, This is a complete green facility.

Europe
 Sherburn-in-Elmet, England – Optare Bus

Middle East
 Ras Al Khaimah, UAE [established 2011] – bus manufacturing facility – joint venture between Ashok Leyland and Ras Al Khaimah Economic Zone (RAKEZ) in UAE.

Technical Centre
Ashok Leyland's Technical Centre, at Vellivoyalchavadi (VVC) in the outskirts of North Chennai near Minjur, is a state-of-the-art product development facility, that apart from modern test tracks and component test labs, also houses India's one and only eight poster testing equipment.

Former manufacturing units
 Letnany in Prague, Czech – Avia plant, closed in 2013

Philanthropy 

Ashok Leyland, flagship of the Hinduja Group, has CSR programs in environment, health, education and infrastructure. In 2015–16, Ashok Leyland partnered with Learning Links Foundation, an NGO, to develop and provide a holistic program, consisting of educational and health improvements, to the children in India who drop out of school due to lack of infrastructure, poor financial and living conditions that make it difficult for them to pursue education and improve their standard of living. The Road to School program began with 36 schools in Shoolagiri and Anchetty in Krishnagiri district, Tamil Nadu, and has now reached 714 schools impacting more than 55,000 students in government primary and upper primary schools.

In 2019, in partnership with the Akshaya Patra Foundation, Ashok Leyland launched the Breakfast Program that benefitted 7,800 students in 70 Government schools in Shoolagiri and Thally Block. The program was aimed to provide hot and nutritious breakfast to the school children. The program is also aimed at bringing social equality among the children belonging to remote villages.

iCare 
In 2020, in wake of the pandemic, COVID-19, Hinduja Foundation launched the ‘iCare: Volunteer from Home’ initiative which was aimed at reaching out to the underprivileged children across the nation and provide online education. Under this initiative, employees of the Hinduja Group Companies, including Ashok Leyland and others, interacted with the students and their families to engage them in a range of activities through technology based online and offline interactive modes. The iCare initiative spanned over the states of Rajasthan, Maharashtra, Madhya Pradesh, Odisha, Chhattisgarh, Karnataka, Tamil Nadu, Telangana.

All-Women production line 
Ashok Leyland has unveiled a new production line for engines at its Hosur manufacturing plant that will be exclusively staffed by female employees. The introduction of an all-female production line by Ashok Leyland aims to promote women's empowerment and encourage their participation in the manufacturing industry. The flagship company of the Hinduja Group has established the new line with a workforce of 80 women.

Awards and recognition
In 2019, the company was awarded the AON Best Employers for India award.
In 2019, Ashok Leyland was ranked as 34th best brand in India by Interbrand.

See also
 British Leyland
 Leyland Motors

References

External links

Lanka Leyland Official site

 
Indian companies established in 1948
John Deere
Companies based in Chennai
Vehicle manufacturing companies established in 1948
Holding companies established in 1948
Indian brands
India–United Kingdom relations
Companies listed on the National Stock Exchange of India
Companies listed on the Bombay Stock Exchange